Côtis-Capel (22 January 1915 – 30 October 1986) was the pen name of Albert Lohier, a Norman language poet. He was from La Hague and wrote in the Haguais dialect of Cotentinais.

Bibliography
 Poetry collections
 Rocâles (1951),
 À Gravage (1965), prix littéraire du Cotentin
 Raz-Bannes (1970),
 Graund Caté (1985),
 Les Côtis (1985).
 Posthumous novel
 Ganache lé vuus péqueus (1987).

Certain of his poems have been set to music by the group Magène.

Norman-language poets
Norman-language writers
French male poets